Christ Hospital may refer to:

Healthcare institution
The Christ Hospital, in Cincinnati, Ohio
Christ Hospital, Jersey City, New Jersey
 Christ's Hospital in Topeka, Kansas; now Stormont–Vail HealthCare
 Advocate Christ Medical Center, in Oak Lawn, Illinois

School
Christ's Hospital, an English independent day and boarding school in West Sussex, England
Lincoln Christ's Hospital School, a state secondary school with academy status in Lincoln, Lincolnshire, England.

Charity
Christ's Hospital of Abingdon, a charity based in Abingdon, England